Amanecer is an album by Bomba Estéreo. It earned Bomba Estéreo a Latin Grammy Award nomination for Best Alternative Music Album and a Grammy Award nomination for Best Latin Rock, Urban or Alternative Album. It peaked at number 17 on the Billboard Top Latin Albums chart. It was also considered the best Latin album of 2015 by Rolling Stone.

It includes the viral hit "Soy Yo", which features Costa Rican child star Sarai Gonzalez, and received over 109 million views on YouTube. The song and video were called a "celebration of self and a symbol of proud Latinidad" and "an ode to brown girls".

Track listing

Usage in media
In 2020, GrubHub used the song Soy Yo in a commercial that immediately gained attention in meme culture. The song can also be heard during the end credits of Dora and the Lost City of Gold, commercials for The CW crime drama In The Dark, and a commercial for the Samsung Galaxy S8. Pizzeria Pizza Napoletana, a restaurant specialized in Neapolitan pizza, also used this song when they sponsored the delivery service Just Eat in their Instagram stories. The song also appears in the soundtrack of the 2021 racing video game Forza Horizon 5. Caderas was featured as the diegetic soundtrack to the opening police-siege scenes of the 2019 American action-adventure film Triple Frontier. In 2021, a remix of this song was used in Illumination's Sing 2.

Charts

Certifications

References

2015 albums
Bomba Estéreo albums
Sony Music Latin albums
Spanish-language albums